John B. Bell is an American mathematician and the Chief Scientist of the Computational Research Division at the Lawrence Berkeley National Laboratory. He has made contributions in the areas of finite difference methods, numerical methods for low Mach number flows, adaptive mesh refinement, interface tracking and parallel computing. He has also worked on the application of these numerical methods to problems from a broad range of fields, including combustion, shock physics, seismology, flow in porous media and astrophysics.

Career
Bell received his Ph.D. from Cornell University in 1979. Following a three-year stint at the Naval Surface Weapons Center, he spent four years at Exxon Production Research, where he was the group leader of the Applied Mathematics Group in the Long Range Research Division. He worked at Lawrence Livermore National Laboratory from 1986 until 1996, when he joined Lawrence Berkeley National Laboratory. He is currently the Chief Scientist in LBNL's  Computational Research Division of the Computing Sciences Area. He was one of the founders and is the current managing editor of Communications in Applied Mathematics and Computational Science (CAMCOS).

Awards and honors
In 2018, Bell received the Berkeley Lab Prize Lifetime Achievement Award for "intellectual and strategic leadership in applied mathematics at LBNL, and for design and development of sophisticated numerical strategies to address critical scientific problems in support of DOE’s research missions.".  In 2012, Bell was elected to the National Academy of Sciences.  He is also a Fellow of the Society for Industrial and Applied Mathematics (SIAM). He is the recipient of the Sidney Fernbach Award from the IEEE Computer Society in 2005, given each year to one person who has made "an outstanding contribution in the application of high performance computers using innovative approaches. He also received the SIAM/ACM prize  for computational science and engineering in 2003.

References

External links
Bell's home page at LBL

Cornell University alumni
Computational fluid dynamicists
Numerical analysts
20th-century American mathematicians
21st-century American mathematicians
1954 births
Fellows of the Society for Industrial and Applied Mathematics
Living people
Massachusetts Institute of Technology alumni
University of California, Berkeley staff
Members of the United States National Academy of Sciences